Florence Ayisi was born in Kumba in Cameroon on 22nd July 1962). She is an academic and filmmaker. Her film Sisters in Law won more than 27 awards (including the Prix Art et Essai at the Cannes Film Festival in 2005 and a Peabody Award) and was short-listed for an Academy Award nomination in 2006. She won the UK Film Council Breakthrough Brits Award for Film Talent in 2008. Since 2000 she has taught film at the University of South Wales.

Ayisi founded the production company Iris Films in 2005. In 2007 she was recognised with a meeting with the Queen for her work's link with Commonwealth countries.

Qualifications 
 Certificate in Higher Education (Cert Ed) (1997) – School of Education, University of Sunderland, U.K.
 MA in Film Production (1992)  Northern School of Film and Television, Leeds Metropolitan University, U.K.
 MA in Theatre and Media Production (1989) – University of Hull, U.K
 Diploma in Television Production and Journalism (1987), Television Training Centre, Fulham Studios, London
 BA in English (1986) - Faculty of Modern Letters and Social Sciences – University of Yaoundé, Cameroon, Central Africa

Filmography
 Zanzibar Soccer Dreams (Florence Ayisi & Catalin Brylla, 2016, 64 mins) -
 Transforming Lives: PNDP and Rural Development in Cameroon (2014, 35 mins)
 Handing Down Time – Cameroon (2012, 55 mins)
 Cameroonian Women in Motion (2012, 10 mins)
 Art of this Place: Women Artists in Cameroon (2011, 40 mins)
 Zanzibar Soccer Queens (2007/2008, 87 & 52 mins)
 Our World in Zanzibar (2007, 35 mins)
 My Mother: Isange (2005, 7 minutes)
 Sisters in Law (2005)  (Florence Ayisi & Kim Longinotto, 2005, 104 mins)
 Reflections (2003)

Reception
Marsha Meskimmon and Dorothy C. Rowe write that "Ayisi's nuanced portraits of the lives of contemporary African women reject simplistic stereotypes and suggest that gender politics in a global world may not divide easily along the lines of nation-states, 'East' and 'West', or 'developed' and ‘developing'." In a 2012 article Olivier Jean TchOuaffé said "Kim Longinotto and Florence Ayisi, in their film Sister-in-Law, stand out for the originality with which they portray the figure of the judge within a post-colonial context of insecurity, as they highlight two strong women as the faces of security and judicial stability" p196. Another review describes the film as "a well-crafted, focused film that really says something about a small, manageable aspect of another culture and the people who shape it." A review in Black Camera describes Sisters in law as "a film that universalises experience without co-opting it."

References

Further reading

External links
Florence Ayisi - Research in Film Website
Florence Ayisi at Women Make Movies
Florence Ayisi at Internet Movie Database
 Florence Ayisi on YouTube

1962 births
Living people
Cameroonian documentary filmmakers
Cameroonian women film directors
Cameroonian film directors
Cameroonian women cinematographers
Women documentary filmmakers